B. B. Ashok Kumar (also known as Tiger Ashok Kumar) is a retired Assistant Commissioner of Police credited with arresting several notorious criminals and the many police encounters in which he was involved trying to capture hardened criminals.

Early life
Born in Parane village, Virajpet, Kodagu district of Karnataka state, he is the son of a coffee estate manager in Koppa-Chikkamagalur.

Police service
Kumar joined the Karnataka State Police Service in 1977 and is credited with 18 encounters. While being a part of Special Task Force of Karnataka Police tasked to nab forest brigand Veerappan, Ashok is reported to have slain 13 accomplices of the brigand.

Ashok and his police team were in the news for the Kammanahalli encounter killing of history-sheeter Station Shekar.

Kumar retired from service on 31 July 2012 and faces constant threat to his life from the criminal underworld.

Honours and awards
He won the President of India's Gold Medal three times and the gold medal of the Chief Minister of Karnataka once. Ashok was given the nickname of 'Tiger' by the Home Minister in 1984.

In films and literature

There are five Kannada movies made on his experience and adventures to date.
Amaanusha (1989), with Ananth Nag acting as Kumar
Circle Inspector (1995), with Devaraj acting as Kumar
Deadly Soma (1998), with Devaraj as Kumar
Deadly-2 (2004), with Devaraj as Kumar
Mynaa (2013) with Sharath Kumar acting as Kumar

Kumar has authored two books,
 Huliya Nenapugalu – 
 Bullet Savari –

References

1952 births
Living people
Indian police officers
Kodava people
People from Kodagu district
Karnataka Police